Luis Fernando Furtado de Oliveira (born 29 November 1990), commonly known as Bolinha, is a Brazilian football midfielder. His former club were FC ViOn Zlaté Moravce and FK Senica.

FK Senica
In January 2011, he joined Slovak club FK Senica on a three-year contract. He made his debut for FK Senica against 1. FC Tatran Prešov on 2 April 2011.

External links
FK Senica profile

References

1990 births
Living people
Brazilian footballers
Brazilian expatriate footballers
Association football midfielders
Cerâmica Atlético Clube players
FK Senica players
FC ViOn Zlaté Moravce players
Slovak Super Liga players
Expatriate footballers in Slovakia
Brazilian expatriate sportspeople in Slovakia
People from Viamão